Irene Sloan (19 September 1942, Los Angeles — 20 May 2008, Woodland Hills, California) was an American music critic and journalist and the founder of the Wagner Society of Southern California. Along with her husband, Sherwin Sloan, she founded The Opera Quarterly in 1983. The Sloans oversaw the publication for the first six volumes (1983–89).

References

1942 births
2008 deaths
American music critics
American women journalists
American women music critics
People from Los Angeles
Women writers about music
Journalists from California
20th-century American journalists
20th-century American women
21st-century American women